Mike Winkler is an American politician currently serving as a member of the Connecticut House of Representatives from the 56th district, which includes part of the town of Vernon, since 2017.

Career
In 2016, Winkler was elected to the seat in a close election over Republican Jim Tedford. Winkler was re-elected in 2018 and 2020 over Republican Laura Bush by a 15-point margin both times. In March 2021, Winkler controversially claimed that “you count Asians and other minorities that have never been discriminated against” when responding to a claim made by Sam Romeo, chairman of the Greenwich, Connecticut Housing Authority, that the population of the town of Greenwich was 37% racial minorities. Winkler later apologized after receiving criticism from Asian-American Connecticut politicians such as William Tong and Tony Hwang.

References

External links

Living people
21st-century American politicians
Democratic Party members of the Connecticut House of Representatives
University of Connecticut alumni
Connecticut city council members
Politicians from Pittsburgh
People from Vernon, Connecticut
Year of birth missing (living people)